Leo Dove (24 August 1903 – 14 December 1986) was an Australian sports shooter. He competed in the 50 m rifle event at the 1948 Summer Olympics.

References

1903 births
1986 deaths
Australian male sport shooters
Olympic shooters of Australia
Shooters at the 1948 Summer Olympics
Sportspeople from Melbourne
People from Burnley, Victoria
Sportsmen from Victoria (Australia)